Om Kret is one of the twelve subdistricts (tambon) of Pak Kret District, in Nonthaburi Province, Thailand. The subdistrict is bounded by (clockwise from north) Bang Phlap, Ko Kret, Tha It, Bang Rak Noi, Bang Rak Phatthana and Phimon Rat subdistricts. In 2020 it had a total population of 4,829 people.

Administration

Central administration
The subdistrict is subdivided into 6 administrative villages (muban).

Local administration
The whole area of the subdistrict is covered by Om Kret Subdistrict Administrative Organization.

References

External links
Website of Om Kret Subdistrict Administrative Organization

Tambon of Nonthaburi province
Populated places in Nonthaburi province